Claderia is a genus of flowering plants from the orchid family, Orchidaceae. Only two species are known, both epiphytes native to southeast Asia and New Guinea.

Claderia papuana Schltr. - New Guinea and possibly the Philippines
Claderia viridiflora Hook.f. - Thailand, Peninsular Malaysia, Borneo, Sumatra, Sulawesi. Reported also from Cambodia, Java and New Guinea but these sitings are unconfirmed.

See also 
 List of Orchidaceae genera

References 

 Pridgeon, A.M., Cribb, P.J., Chase, M.A. & Rasmussen, F. eds. (1999). Genera Orchidacearum 1. Oxford Univ. Press.
 Pridgeon, A.M., Cribb, P.J., Chase, M.A. & Rasmussen, F. eds. (2001). Genera Orchidacearum 2. Oxford Univ. Press.
 Pridgeon, A.M., Cribb, P.J., Chase, M.A. & Rasmussen, F. eds. (2003). Genera Orchidacearum 3. Oxford Univ. Press
 Berg Pana, H. 2005. Handbuch der Orchideen-Namen. Dictionary of Orchid Names. Dizionario dei nomi delle orchidee. Ulmer, Stuttgart

External links 

Eulophiinae genera
Epiphytic orchids
Eulophiinae
Taxa named by Joseph Dalton Hooker